Crespin is a commune in the Nord department in northern France. The town of Crespin was founded in 648 with the building of the Crespin Abbey by Saint Landelin. Its population was 4,532 in 2017.

Heraldry

See also
Communes of the Nord department

References
 

Communes of Nord (French department)